Henry Peleg Burdick was a member of the Wisconsin State Assembly.

Biography
Burdick was born on January 11, 1849, in Warren County, Pennsylvania; reports have differed on the exact location. He moved with his parents to Waterloo, Jefferson County, Wisconsin, in 1854. After moving to St. Croix County, Wisconsin, in 1856, Burdick later briefly spent time in Otter Tail County, Minnesota. During the American Civil War, he served with the 1st Minnesota Heavy Artillery Regiment of the Union Army. In 1877, Burdick moved to Polk County, Wisconsin. He died on May 12, 1933, in Tacoma, Washington.

Political career
Burdick was elected to the Assembly in 1892 and 1894. During his second term, he served as Speaker Pro Tem when the Speaker, George B. Burrows, became ill. Additionally, Burdick was President (similar to Mayor) and a member of the school board of Osceola, Wisconsin, and District Attorney and a member of the county board of supervisors of Polk County. He was a Republican.

References

External links
Burdick Family Association

People from Warren County, Pennsylvania
People from Waterloo, Wisconsin
People from St. Croix County, Wisconsin
People from Osceola, Wisconsin
Politicians from Tacoma, Washington
Republican Party members of the Wisconsin State Assembly
Mayors of places in Wisconsin
County supervisors in Wisconsin
District attorneys in Wisconsin
School board members in Wisconsin
People of Wisconsin in the American Civil War
People of Minnesota in the American Civil War
Union Army soldiers
1849 births
1933 deaths
Burials in Washington (state)
People from Polk County, Wisconsin